Tonalea is a census-designated place (CDP) in Coconino County, Arizona, United States.  The population was 549 at the 2010 census. It has also been known as Red Lake.



Geography
Tonalea is located at  (36.317714, -110.970341), along U.S. Route 160 (aka the Navajo Trail).

Demographics

As of the census of 2000, there were 562 people, 123 households, and 104 families living in the CDP. There were 135 housing units at an average density of 14.0/sq mi (5.4/km2). The racial makeup of the CDP was 99.1% Native American, 0.7% White, and 0.2% from other races.  0.9% of the population were Hispanic or Latino of any race.

There were 123 households, out of which 55.3% had children under the age of 18 living with them, 53.7% were married couples living together, 23.6% had a female householder with no husband present, and 15.4% were non-families. 14.6% of all households were made up of individuals, and 2.4% had someone living alone who was 65 years of age or older.  The average household size was 4.57 and the average family size was 5.13.

In the CDP, the age distribution of the population shows 48.9% under the age of 18, 10.1% from 18 to 24, 24.6% from 25 to 44, 13.0% from 45 to 64, and 3.4% who were 65 years of age or older.  The median age was 19 years. For every 100 females, there were 93.8 males.  For every 100 females age 18 and over, there were 93.9 males.

The median income for a household in the CDP was $32,059, and the median income for a family was $32,206. Males had a median income of $36,333 versus $15,750 for females. The per capita income for the CDP was $8,171.  About 10.8% of families and 13.6% of the population were below the poverty line, including 16.9% of those under age 18 and none of those age 65 or over.

Education
Tuba City Unified School District is the local school district. Tuba City High School is the comprehensive high school.

See also

 List of census-designated places in Arizona

References

External links

Census-designated places in Coconino County, Arizona
Populated places on the Navajo Nation
Census-designated places in Arizona